Aleksandr Anatolyevich Katsalapov (born 5 April 1986) is a Russian former footballer.

Club career
He made his professional debut in the Russian Second Division in 2005 for FC Rotor Volgograd.

He made his Russian Premier League debut for FC Torpedo Moscow on 2 August 2014 in a game against PFC CSKA Moscow.

References

1986 births
Sportspeople from Volgograd
Living people
Russian footballers
Association football defenders
FC Rotor Volgograd players
FC Ural Yekaterinburg players
FC Tyumen players
FC Torpedo Moscow players
Russian Premier League players
FC Ufa players
FC Orenburg players
FC Ararat Moscow players